Stirling University Womens Football Club is a women's football club that play in the Scottish Women's Premier League, the top division of women's football in Scotland.

History

Founded in March 2015, the team is a football partnership between the University of Stirling and Falkirk after a pilot in 2014 which saw the University staff provide coaching and sports science support to Falkirk.

Current squad
As of 9 May 2021

References

External links

Women's Football at the University of Stirling

Women's football clubs in Scotland
Scottish Women's Premier League clubs
University of Stirling
Football clubs in Stirling (council area)
University and college football clubs in Scotland
Association football clubs established in 2015
2015 establishments in Scotland